Penistone East is a ward in the metropolitan borough of Barnsley, South Yorkshire, England.  The ward contains three listed buildings that are recorded in the National Heritage List for England.   Of these, one is listed at Grade II*, the middle of the three grades, and the others are at Grade II, the lowest grade.  The ward is to the west of the town of Barnsley, and is entirely rural.  The listed buildings consist of a former manor house and associated structures converted for residential use, a memorial obelisk and a lodge in the grounds of Wentworth Castle, and a former canal aqueduct.


Key

Buildings

References

Citations

Sources

 

Lists of listed buildings in South Yorkshire
Buildings and structures in the Metropolitan Borough of Barnsley